The Type 89 tank destroyer (military designation PTZ-89, industrial designation WA320) is a Chinese armored, tracked, tank destroyer vehicle developed by Norinco for the People’s Liberation Army. The vehicle was developed in the 1980s and entered service in 1989.

Development
Armed with a 120 millimeter smoothbore gun, it was intended to combat newer generations of Western and Russian main battle tanks that were equipped with composite armor and 120 and 125 millimeter caliber guns. Despite a successful development process, with the end of the Cold War it became apparent that the weapon was no longer needed. Production was halted in 1995 after around 100 examples had been built. An official retirement ceremony was held by the 39th Army Group on 3 November 2015.

Operators

: 230 built and in store (no longer in active service)

See also
Type 11 Assault vehicle
AFT-10 ATGM Carrier

References

Tank destroyers
Armoured fighting vehicles of the People's Republic of China
Military vehicles introduced in the 1980s